is a passenger railway station in located in the city of Neyagawa, Osaka Prefecture, Japan, operated by West Japan Railway Company (JR West).

Lines

Station layout
The station has one ground-level island platform in a cutting with the station building on higher ground and connected to the platform by an elevator. The station is staffed.

Platforms

Adjacent stations

History
The station changed its name to the present one on 16 March 2019.

Station numbering was introduced in March 2018 with Neyagawakōen being assigned station number JR-H32.

Passenger statistics
In fiscal 2019, the station was used by an average of 4,381 passengers daily (boarding passengers only).

Surrounding area
 Neyagawa Park
 Osaka Fukujuji Hospital 
 Ishinohoden Kofun
 Neyagawa Municipal Fourth Junior High School
Neyagawa City Meiwa Elementary School
Neyagawa City Umegaoka Elementary School

References

External links

Official home page 

Railway stations in Osaka Prefecture
Railway stations in Japan opened in 1979
Neyagawa, Osaka